The Paris Conversations, or  ('Old German conversations') are an eleventh-century phrasebook for Romance-speakers (perhaps specifically Old French speakers) needing to communicate in spoken German. The text takes its name from the modern location of the sole surviving manuscript: according to Herbert Penzl, the text survives in the margins of a tenth-century manuscript of unrelated texts, Paris, Bibliothèque Nationale, MS. Lat. 7641 (with one leaf in Vatican Library MS. 566). The language is a colloquial north-western dialect of German, providing valuable evidence for everyday spoken German.

While in some ways a practical text useful to a cleric or aristocrat traveling in the German-speaking world, the text is also humorous, containing insults and envisaging scenarios like skipping church services to have sex.

Sample text
An example of the text, giving the German, then the Latin, and then a modern English translation, runs as follows:
(51.)  ["Give me my horse."]
(52.)  ["Give me my shield."]
(53.)  ["Give me my spear."]
(54.)  ["Give me my sword."]
(55.)  ["Give me my gloves."]
(56.)  ["Give me my staff."]
(57.)  ["Give me my knife."]
(58.)  ["Give me (a) candle."]

Editions
 Wilhelm Grimm, Kleinere Schriften (Berlin: Giitersloh, 1883), III, 473-513.
 E. Steinmeyer and E. Sievers, Die althochdeutschen Glossen, V, 517-24 (Berlin: Weidmann, 1879 ff.).
 W. Braune-E.A. Ebbinghaus, Althochdeutsches Lesebuch (Tübingen: Niemeyer, 1969), pp. 8-11.
 BNF catalogue record

Studies

 W. Haubrichs, " Zur Herkunft der 'Altdeutschen (Pariser) Gespräche'," Zeitschrift für deutsches Altertum und deutsche Literatur, 101.1 (1st Quarter, 1972), pp. 86-103.
 F. Jolles, "The Hazards of Travel in Medieval Germany," German Life and Letters, 21 (1968), 309-19.
 R. Schützeichel, "Das westfränkische Problem," in Deutsche Wortforschung in europäischen Bezügen (Giessen: W. Schmitz, 1963), pp. 469-523
 Kershaw, Paul, "Laughter After Babel’s Fall: Misunderstanding and Miscommunication in the Ninth-century West," in Humour, History and Politics in Late Antiquity and the Early Middle Ages, ed. by Guy Halsall (Cambridge: Cambridge University Press, 2002), pp. 179–202.

See also
 Kassel conversations

References

Old High German literature
Writers from the Carolingian Empire
Bibliothèque nationale de France collections
Bilingual books
11th-century Latin books